Warland may refer to:

 Dale Warland, an American conductor and composer
 Betsy Warland, a Canadian writer and poet
 Warland, a hamlet in the South Pennines, England, on the border of Yorkshire and Greater Manchester

See also
 Warlands